Peyton Clark Cottage, also known as "Woodthorpe," is a historic cure cottage located at Saranac Lake, town of St. Armand in Essex County, New York.  It was built in 1915 and is a -story rectangular structure with stucco siding and a gable roof and trimmed with green wood  in the Tudor Revival style.  It features two over/under cure porches running along the entire south side.  A 1971 fire destroyed five bedrooms and the roof.

It was listed on the National Register of Historic Places in 1992.

References

Houses on the National Register of Historic Places in New York (state)
Tudor Revival architecture in New York (state)
Houses completed in 1915
Houses in Essex County, New York
National Register of Historic Places in Essex County, New York
1915 establishments in New York (state)